Lissard Ringforts are two ringforts and a National Monument located in County Galway, Ireland.

Location
Lissard Ringforts are located 2 km (1¼ mile) northeast of Kilconnell.

History and description
There are two major ringforts in Lissard.

North ringfort

South ringfort

References

National Monuments in County Galway
Archaeological sites in County Galway